Habibollah Sayyari (birth 1955) is the Coordinating Deputy of the Islamic Republic of Iran Army and the former Commander of the Islamic Republic of Iran Navy (the "Regular Navy").

He is a former Marine Commando who fought in the Iran–Iraq war.

Military service
Rear Admiral Habibollah Sayyari was commissioned in the Artesh in 1974 and served in Imperial Iran Navy prior to the Revolution. Sayyari saw combat during the Iran-Iraq war as a Naval Commando. Sayyari fought and was wounded during the famed battle of Khorramshahr during the Iran-Iraq War.

Habibollah Sayyari has served as the Commander of the 1st Marine Rifle Brigade; Commander of the Manjil Marine Commando Training Center, Deputy IRIN 1st Naval District Commander, IRIN 4th Naval District Commander and he has also served staff tours as the Assistant Deputy Coordinator, Military Advisor, Deputy of Administrative Affairs for Combat Services Support, Artesh Joint Staff Headquarters; IRIN Deputy Commander from 2005 to 2007; IRIN Commander 2007–2018.

References

External links

Living people
1955 births
Islamic Republic of Iran Navy commodores
Iranian Takavar Marines
Commanders of Islamic Republic of Iran Navy
Islamic Republic of Iran Army personnel of the Iran–Iraq War